Lucas is a 2021 Spanish thriller drama film directed by Àlex Montoya which stars Jorge Motos as the title character.

Plot 
In the wake of the death of his father, Lucas, a teenager, accepts an offer to cede own photographs to Álvaro in exchange for money. The latter, an adult man, wants to used them to contact with reportedly "young girls" in social media by means of catfishing.

Cast

Production 
Lucas is based on the short film of the same name directed by Àlex Montoya and shot in 2012. The film was produced by Raw Pictures and Telespan 2000, with the participation of the Institut Valencià de Cultura (IVC), RTVE and À Punt Media. It was shot in locations of the province of Valencia, including Valencia, El Palmar and La Albufera.

Release 
The film opened the Zonazine section of the Málaga Spanish Film Festival (FMCE) in June 2021. Distributed by Begin Again, it was theatrically released in Spain on 25 June 2021.

Awards and nominations 

|-
| align = "center" rowspan = "9" | 2021 || rowspan = "9" | 4th Berlanga Awards || colspan = "2" | Best Film ||  || rowspan = "9" | 
|-
| Best Director || Àlex Montoya || 
|-
| Best Screenplay || Àlex Montoya & Sergio Barrejón || 
|-
| Best Actor || Jorge Motos ||   
|-
| rowspan = "2" | Best Supporting Actor || Jorge Cabrera || 
|-
| Jordi Aguilar || 
|-
| Best Editing and Post-production || Àlex Montoya || 
|-
| Best Cinematography and Lighting || Jon D. Domínguez || 
|-
| Best Art Direction || Jero Bono || 
|-
| align = "center" rowspan = "2" | 2022 || 77th CEC Medals || Best New Actor || Jorge Motos ||  || 
|-
| 36th Goya Awards || Best New Actor || Jorge Motos ||  || align = "center" | 
|}

See also 
 List of Spanish films of 2021

References

External links 
 Lucas at ICAA's Catálogo de Cinespañol

Films about child sexual abuse
2021 films
2020s Spanish-language films
2021 thriller drama films
Spanish thriller drama films
Films shot in Valencia
2020s Spanish films
Features based on short films